URM may mean:

Companies, groups, organizations
Under-represented minority
Ministry of Foreign Affairs (Lithuania)
Union Rescue Mission, a homeless Christian shelter in Los Angeles
URM Stores, a retail cooperative in the north-western United States

Science, technology, engineering
Uniform Requirements for Manuscripts Submitted to Biomedical Journals
Unreinforced masonry building, a construction method
Universal Rocket Module, modular stages of the Russian Angara rocket

Other uses
Urap language (ISO 639 language code: urm)
United Republics of Mars, the technocratic government that created Alita, from the 2019 film Alita: Battle Angel

See also